Events from the year 1703 in Russia

Summary 

 The beginning of the Great Northern War: In February, Russian forces led by Peter the Great invaded Sweden, beginning a conflict that would last until 1721.
 The construction of the Peter and Paul Fortress: In May, work began on the fortress in Saint Petersburg, which was intended to defend the city against attacks from the Swedish army. The fortress would go on to become a major landmark and a symbol of the city.
 The foundation of the city of Saint Petersburg: In May, Peter the Great officially founded the city of Saint Petersburg on the banks of the Neva River. The city would become the new capital of Russia and a major cultural and economic hub.
 The Battle of Kalisz: In October, Russian forces fought against the Swedish army at the Battle of Kalisz in Poland. The battle ended in a decisive victory for the Russian army.

Incumbents
 Monarch – Peter I

Events

 Kronstadt
 Peter and Paul Fortress
 Sankt-Peterburgskie Vedomosti
 Saint Petersburg
Great Northern War
The Battle of Kalisz

Births

Deaths

References

 
Years of the 18th century in Russia